Gravity Investments is an American investment services company. It is based in Denver, Colorado. Founded in 2000 by James Damschroder, the company operates as a digital advice platform or Institutional RoboAdvisory. They developed Gsphere, a software platform.

History
The company was issued patents in 2009 for its visual representation of a portfolio, and again in 2011 for Diversification Measurement and Analysis System.

Gravity Capital Partners (the investment management subsidiary and a Registered Investment Adviser) was founded in 2010 by James Damschroder and John Osland.

Modern portfolio theory 
The underlying portfolio optimization process is an offshoot of modern portfolio theory; it uses diversification optimization to create diversification-weighted portfolios and provides tools for portfolio analysis. Once a portfolio is plugged in, it allows advisers to holistically determine which asset classes clients are too invested in and which ones may broaden the portfolio.

References

Privately held companies
Companies based in Denver
Financial services companies established in 2000